is a town located in Mizuma District, Fukuoka Prefecture, Japan.

As of March 31, 2017, the town has an estimated population of 14,314 and a density of 780 persons per km². The total area is 18.43 km².

References

External links

Ōki official website 

Towns in Fukuoka Prefecture